Gerry Methe (born December 12, 1951) is a Canadian former professional ice hockey defenceman.

Career
Methe was selected by the Pittsburgh Penguins in the fourth round (46th overall) of the 1971 NHL Amateur Draft. Methe played five regular season and two playoff games with the New England Whalers of the World Hockey Association during the 1974–75 season.

As a youth, he played in the 1964 Quebec International Pee-Wee Hockey Tournament with a minor ice hockey team from Richmond Hill, Ontario. Prior to turning professional, Methe played major junior hockey with the Oshawa Generals of the Ontario Hockey Association.

The Toledo Goaldiggers of the International Hockey League acquired Methe halfway through the 1975-76 season after the Cape Codders folded mid-season.

Career statistics

References

External links

1951 births
Living people
Binghamton Dusters players
Canadian ice hockey defencemen
Cape Codders players
Fort Wayne Komets players
Hershey Bears players
Ice hockey people from Ottawa
New England Whalers players
Oshawa Generals players
Pittsburgh Penguins draft picks
Toledo Goaldiggers players